Hodnett is an English habitational surname related to the Hodnet village. Notable people with the surname include:

Charlie Hodnett (1861–1890), American baseball player
Claire Hodnett, English rugby union referee
George Desmond Hodnett (1918–1990), Irish musician, songwriter and music critic
Grant Hodnett (born 1982), South African-born English cricketer
Joe Hodnett (1896–1978), English footballer
Kyle Hodnett (born 1986), South African-born English cricketer
John Hodnett (born 1999), Irish rugby union player

References

English-language surnames